Karl Ludwig Wilhelm Gerok  (27 January 1906 – 28 June 1975) was a German organist, composer and organ teacher.

Career 

Karl Ludwig Gerok studied organ at the Musikhochschule Stuttgart under organist Arnold Strebel and then with Karl Straube in Leipzig.

From 1930, Gerok was cathedral organist in Halberstadt. He worked from 1946 as an organ teacher at the School of Church Music (Kirchenmusikschule) in Esslingen am Neckar and later at the Musikhochschule Stuttgart where he taught Künstlerisches und liturgisches Orgelspiel (Concert and church organ playing). Among his students were composer Edgar Rabsch (de) (1928–1990) as well as Helmuth Rilling. He was the author of the standard work Lehrgang der Orgelimprovisation (Course of organ improvisation, 1976).

During this time he was also a significant contributor and editor of the collection Württembergisches Choralbuch, which includes 15 chorale preludes on hymns such as "Aus tiefer Not schrei ich zu dir", "Herzliebster Jesu" and "Gelobt sei Gott im höchsten Thron". Prelude on "Christ ist erstanden" (1933) and "O Traurigkeit, o Herzeleid" (1940) appeared in Neue Choralvorspiele zu den Liedern des Evangelischen Kirchengesangbuchs (New chorale preludes to songs of the Protestant hymnal) in Tübingen in 1976.

Gerok died in Murrhardt where he is buried on the Walterichsfriedhof.

Literature 

 Volker Lutz: Erinnerungen an Karl Gerok. In: Württembergische  Blätter für Kirchenmusik, 2006, Nr. 1. 
 Karl Ludwig Gerok, Organist an der Stiftskirche Stuttgart, Lebensstationen. In: Programmheft der Petruskirche zum 100. Geburtstag

References

External links 

 

German organists
German male organists
1906 births
1975 deaths
20th-century German composers
State University of Music and Performing Arts Stuttgart alumni
20th-century organists
20th-century German male musicians